Sylvia Ratnasamy (born  1976) is a Belgian-Indian computer scientist. She is best known as one of the inventors of the distributed hash table (DHT). Her doctoral dissertation proposed the content-addressable networks, one of the original DHTs, and she received the ACM Grace Murray Hopper Award in 2014 for this work. She is currently a professor at the University of California, Berkeley.

Life and career
Ratnasamy received her Bachelor of Engineering from the University of Pune in 1997. She began doctoral work at UC Berkeley advised by Scott Shenker during which time she worked at the International Computer Science Institute in Berkeley, CA. She graduated from UC Berkeley with her doctoral degree in 2002.

For her doctoral thesis, she designed and implemented what would eventually become known as one of the four original Distributed Hash Tables, the Content addressable network (CAN).

Ratnasamy was a lead researcher at Intel Labs until 2011, when she began as an assistant professor at UC Berkeley. In recent years, Ratnasamy has focused her research on programmable networks including the RouteBricks software router and pioneering work in Network Functions Virtualization (NFV). In 2016, she co-founded Nefeli Networks to commercialize NFV technologies.

Personal
Her father is noted chemist Paul Ratnasamy.

Awards 

 Grace Murray Hopper Award
 Sloan Fellowship
 ACM SIGCOMM Test-of-Time Award (2011)
 ACM SIGCOMM Rising Star Award (2017)

References 

1970s births
Living people
Internet pioneers
Women inventors
Women Internet pioneers
Computer systems researchers
Belgian women computer scientists
Belgian people of Indian descent
University of California, Berkeley faculty
Savitribai Phule Pune University alumni
Belgian expatriates in India
Belgian expatriates in the United States
21st-century Belgian women scientists